Ľubomír Vaic (born 6 March 1977) is a Slovak former professional ice hockey player who spent most of his career in the Slovak Extraliga. After several years in Slovakia Vaic joined the Canucks in 1999, and played 9 games for them over two seasons. He returned to Europe in 2000, and continued to play in various leagues before retiring in 2017. Internationally Vaic played for the Slovakian national team at several tournaments at both the junior and senior level, and won a bronze medal at the 2003 World Championship.

Biography
As a youth, Vaic played in the 1991 Quebec International Pee-Wee Hockey Tournament with a minor ice hockey team from Poprad.

Drafted by the Canucks 227th overall in the 1996 NHL Entry Draft, Vaic came to North America a year later. He scored 27 points in 50 games for the Syracuse Crunch, Vancouver's AHL affiliate. He also earned a 5-game callup to the Canucks, where he scored his only NHL goal, and added an assist.

Vaic returned to Slovakia for another year before returning to the Canucks organization for the 1999–2000 season. However, he would find himself in much the same situation, scoring 42 points in 63 games for Syracuse, and being held pointless in 4 NHL games in Vancouver. Following the season, he was released by the Canucks, who considered him too small to be a significant NHL contributor.

Returning to Europe, Vaic became something of a nomad, appearing with five clubs in five different major European leagues over the next five seasons. He was, however, a consistent offensive performer, and helped Metallurg Magnitogorsk to the Russian league championship in 2003–04. He would finally find a long-term home in the Czech Extraliga, after signing with HC Bílí Tygři Liberec in 2004. In 2005–06, he finished 2nd in scoring in the Extraliga, and helped Liberec to the league championship. At the end of the 2006–07 season he joined HC Sparta Prague.

Vaic has appeared in 9 NHL games, recording a goal and an assist for two points. He has also represented Slovakia at three World Championships, winning a silver medal in 2000 and a bronze medal in 2003.

Career statistics

Regular season and playoffs

International

References

External links
 

1977 births
Living people
Eisbären Berlin players
HC Bílí Tygři Liberec players
HC Košice players
HC Slovan Bratislava players
HC Sparta Praha players
HK Poprad players
HK Spišská Nová Ves players
Metallurg Magnitogorsk players
Sportspeople from Spišská Nová Ves
SaiPa players
Slovak ice hockey centres
Syracuse Crunch players
Vancouver Canucks draft picks
Vancouver Canucks players
VHK Vsetín players
Slovak expatriate ice hockey players in Russia
Slovak expatriate ice hockey players in the United States
Slovak expatriate ice hockey players in Canada
Slovak expatriate ice hockey players in Sweden
Slovak expatriate ice hockey players in the Czech Republic
Slovak expatriate ice hockey players in Germany
Slovak expatriate ice hockey players in Finland